Gennadi Aleksandrovich Gusarov (11 March 1937 – 2 June 2014) was a Soviet Russian football player.

Honours
 Soviet Top League winner: 1960, 1963.
 Soviet Top League runner-up: 1961, 1967.
 Soviet Cup winner: 1960, 1967.
 Soviet Cup finalist: 1961.
 1964 European Nations' Cup runner-up: 1964.
 Grigory Fedotov club member.
 Top 33 players year-end list: five times.
 Soviet Top League top scorer: 1960, 1961.

International career
He earned 11 caps and scored 4 goals for the USSR national football team, and represented the country in the 1958 FIFA World Cup, the 1962 FIFA World Cup, and the 1964 European Nations' Cup.

References

External links
Profile (in Russian)

1937 births
2014 deaths
Moscow Aviation Institute alumni
Footballers from Moscow
Russian footballers
Soviet footballers
Soviet Union international footballers
1958 FIFA World Cup players
1962 FIFA World Cup players
1964 European Nations' Cup players
FC Dynamo Barnaul players
FC Torpedo Moscow players
FC Dynamo Moscow players
Soviet Top League players
Association football midfielders
PFC CSKA Moscow players